Year 1409 (MCDIX) was a common year starting on Tuesday (link will display the full calendar) of the Julian calendar.

Events 
 January–December 
 January 1 – The Welsh surrender Harlech Castle to the English.
 March 25 – The Council of Pisa opens. On June 5 it deposes Pope Gregory XII and Antipope Benedict XIII, and on June 26 crowns Petros Philargos as Pope Alexander V; he is subsequently regarded as an antipope.
 July – Martin I of Aragon succeeds his own son, as King of Sicily.
 August 7 – The Council of Pisa closes.
 December 2 – The University of Leipzig opens.
 December 9 – Louis II of Anjou founds the University of Aix-en-Provence.

 Date unknown 
 Ulugh Beg becomes governor of Samarkand.
 The Republic of Venice purchases the port of Zadar from Hungary.
 Grand Master Ulrich von Jungingen of the Teutonic Knights guarantees peace with the Kalmar Union of Scandinavia, by selling the Baltic Sea island of Gotland to Queen Margaret of Denmark, Norway and Sweden.
 Cheng Ho (or Zheng He), admiral of the Ming empire fleet, deposes the king of Sri Lanka.
 Mircea cel Bătrân successfully defends Silistra against the Ottomans.

Births 
 January 16 – René of Anjou, king of Naples (d. 1480)
 March 2 – Jean II, Duke of Alençon, son of John I of Alençon and Marie of Brittany (d. 1476)
 March 12 – Isabella of Urgell, Duchess of Coimbra, Portuguese Duchess (d. 1459)
 September 13 – Joan of Valois, Duchess of Alençon, French duchess (d. 1432)
 October 7 – Elizabeth of Luxembourg (d. 1442)
 October 21 – Alessandro Sforza, Italian condottiero (d. 1473)
 date unknown – Bernardo Rossellino, Florentine sculptor and architect

Deaths 
 May 13 – Jan of Tarnów, Polish nobleman
 May 22 – Blanche of England, sister of King Henry V (b. 1392)
 July 25 – King Martin I of Sicily (b. 1374)
 September 13 – Isabella of Valois, queen consort of England (b. 1387)
 date unknown – Thomas Merke, English bishop
 probable – Edmund Mortimer, English rebel (b. 1376)

References